MXG or mxg may refer to:

 Maxim Power, Toronto Stock Exchange symbol MXG
 MXG, the IATA code for Marlboro Airport, a defunct airport in Marlborough, Massachusetts
 mxg, the ISO 639-3 code for Mbangala language, Angola